Soliloquy (from Latin: "talking by oneself") is a device often used in drama.

Soliloquy may also refer to:
 Soliloquy (2002 film), a 2002 film by Jacques Zanetti, starring Diahnne Abbott and Drena De Niro
 Soliloquy (McCoy Tyner album), a 1991 live album by McCoy Tyner
 Soliloquy (Walter Bishop Jr. album) a 1977 solo album by Walter Bishop Jr.
 Soliloquy (song), a 1945 song composed by Richard Rodgers

See also 

 Soliloquy for Lilith, a 1988 album by Nurse with Wound
 Soliloquy of the Spanish Cloister, written by Robert Browning, first published in 1842
 Soliloquies of Augustine, a two-book document written in 386–387 AD by the Christian theologian Augustine of Hippo.